Matt Jager (born 11 August 1988) is an Australian golfer who won the Australian Amateur in 2010. He also won the New Zealand Amateur in 2009 and 2010.

Jager turned professional and played on the Canadian Tour in 2012.

Team appearances
Amateur
Nomura Cup (representing Australia): 2009
Eisenhower Trophy (representing Australia): 2010
Sloan Morpeth Trophy (representing Australia): 2009 (winners)

References

External links

Australian male golfers
Australian Institute of Sport golfers
1988 births
Living people